Ernst Vettori (born 25 June 1964) is an Austrian former ski jumper.

Career
He won the Four Hills Tournament twice (1985/1986 and 1986/1987). At the 1992 Winter Olympics, he won gold from the normal hill, and silver in the team competition.

Vettori won five medals at the FIS Nordic World Ski Championships with gold in the team large hill (1991), silver in the team large hill (1985), and bronzes in individual large hill (1987) and team large hill (1987 and 1993). He also won the ski jumping competition at the Holmenkollen ski festival twice (1986 and 1991).

Vettori won the Holmenkollen medal in 1991 (shared with Vegard Ulvang, Trond Einar Elden, and Jens Weißflog). He is now marketing director for the Austrian Ski Association.

World Cup

Standings

Wins

References
 
 Holmenkollen medalists - click Holmenkollmedaljen for downloadable pdf file 
 Holmenkollen winners since 1892 - click Vinnere for downloadable pdf file 

1964 births
Austrian male ski jumpers
Ski jumpers at the 1984 Winter Olympics
Ski jumpers at the 1988 Winter Olympics
Ski jumpers at the 1992 Winter Olympics
Holmenkollen medalists
Holmenkollen Ski Festival winners
Living people
Olympic ski jumpers of Austria
Olympic gold medalists for Austria
Olympic silver medalists for Austria
Olympic medalists in ski jumping
FIS Nordic World Ski Championships medalists in ski jumping
Medalists at the 1992 Winter Olympics
People from Hall in Tirol
Recipients of the Decoration of Honour for Services to the Republic of Austria
Sportspeople from Tyrol (state)
20th-century Austrian people